This article contains a list of books about Hindi film director and actor Raj Kapoor.

Books

Journal articles
 
 
 

Books about film directors
Raj Kapoor